Mechanics' Institute Library may refer to:

 Mechanics Institute Library, King City, Ontario, which became part of the King Township Public Library system
 Bradford Mechanics' Institute Library, established 1832 in Bradford, United Kingdom
 San Francisco Mechanics' Institute Library of the Mechanics' Institute, San Francisco
 Prahran Mechanics' Institute, a library in Victoria, Australia

See also
 Mechanics' Institutes